José Carlos Ragonessi Guzmán (born 11 December 1984) is an Ecuadorian cyclist, who most recently rode for UCI Continental team .

Major results
Source: 

2006
 1st Stage 3 Vuelta al Ecuador
2007
 3rd Road race, National Road Championships
2009
 2nd Time trial, National Road Championships
2010
 National Road Championships
1st  Road race
2nd Time trial
2011
 National Road Championships
1st  Time trial
2nd Road race
2012
 3rd  Madison, Pan American Track Championships (with Byron Guamá)
 10th Overall Tour de Guadeloupe
2013
 7th Time trial, Pan American Road Championships
2014
 1st  Time trial, National Road Championships
 6th Time trial, Pan American Road Championships
2015
 1st  Road race, National Road Championships
2016
 1st  Road race, National Road Championships

References

External links

1984 births
Living people
Ecuadorian male cyclists
Cyclists at the 2011 Pan American Games
Cyclists at the 2015 Pan American Games
Pan American Games competitors for Ecuador